Spetsnaz GRU or Spetsnaz G.U. (formally known as Special Forces of the Main Directorate of the General Staff of the Russian Armed Forces ( Chasti i podrazdeleniya spetsial'nogo naznacheniya (spetsnaz) Glavnogo upravleniya General'nogo shtaba Vooruzhonnykh sil Rossiyskoy Federatsii (SpN GU GSH VS RF)) is the special forces (spetsnaz) of the GRU, the foreign military-intelligence agency of the Armed Forces of the Russian Federation.

The Spetsnaz GRU, the first spetsnaz force in the Soviet Union, formed in 1949 as the military force of the Main Intelligence Directorate (GRU), the foreign military-intelligence agency of the Soviet Armed Forces. The force was designed in the context of the Cold War to carry out reconnaissance and sabotage against enemy targets in the form of special reconnaissance and direct-action attacks. The Spetsnaz GRU inspired additional spetsnaz forces attached to other Soviet intelligence agencies, such as Vympel (founded in 1981) and the Alpha Group (established in 1974) - both within the KGB.

Modus operandi
The concept of using special forces tactics and strategies in the Soviet Union was originally proposed by the military theorist Mikhail Svechnykov, who envisaged the development of unconventional warfare capabilities in order to overcome disadvantages that conventional forces faced in the field. Svechnykov was executed during the Great Purge in 1938, but practical implementation of his ideas was begun by Ilya Starinov, dubbed the "grandfather of the spetsnaz".

Following the entrance of the Soviet Union into World War II, basic forces dedicated to acts of reconnaissance and sabotage were formed under the supervision of the Second Department of the General Staff of the Soviet Armed Forces, and were subordinate to the commanders of Fronts.

The primary function of Spetsnaz troops in wartime was infiltration/insertion behind enemy lines (either in uniform or civilian clothing), usually well before hostilities are scheduled to begin and, once in place, to commit acts of sabotage such as the destruction of vital communications logistics centers, as well as the assassination of key government leaders and military officers.

Spetsnaz GRU training included: weapons handling, fast rappelling, explosives training, marksmanship, counter-terrorism, airborne training, hand-to-hand combat, climbing (alpine rope techniques), diving, underwater combat, emergency medical training, and demolition.

History

Soviet era
The situation was reviewed after the war ended, and between 1947 and 1950 the whole of the Main Intelligence Directorate (GRU) was reorganized.  The first "independent reconnaissance companies of special purpose" were formed in 1949, to work for tank and combined-arms armies, which were tasked to eliminate amongst others enemy nuclear weapons systems such as the MGR-3 Little John and MGM-1 Matador.

In 1957, the first Spetsnaz battalions were formed under the GRU, five to operate beyond the 150–200 km range of the reconnaissance companies. The first brigades were formed in 1962, reportedly to reach up to 750 kilometres in the rear to destroy U.S. weapons systems such as the MGM-52 Lance, MGM-29 Sergeant, and MGM-31 Pershing.

Two 'study regiments' were established in the 1960s to train specialists and NCOs, the first in 1968 at Pechora near Pskov, and the second in 1970 at Chirchik near Tashkent. According to Vladimir Rezun, a GRU defector who used the pseudonym "Viktor Suvorov", there were 20 GRU Spetsnaz brigades plus 41 separate companies at the time of his defection in 1978.

Known missions
The first major foreign operation of the unit came in August 1968, when Moscow decided to crack down on the Prague Spring and move the troops of Warsaw Pact countries into Czechoslovakia. The Spetsnaz GRU was tasked with capturing the Prague Airport. On the night of 21 August, a Soviet passenger plane requested an emergency landing at Prague Airport, allegedly due to engine failure.

After landing, the commandos, without firing a shot, seized the airport and took over air traffic control. At the same time, other Spetsnaz GRU units that had infiltrated into Prague a few days before the operation seized control of other key city points.

In December 1979, the undercover Spetsnaz GRU unit codenamed "Muslim Battalion" participated in Operation Storm-333, the successful mission to assassinate Hafizullah Amin, the President of Afghanistan, and to capture Amin's residential palace which triggered the Soviet–Afghan War.

Most of Spetsnaz GRU's operations remain classified even after the dissolution of the Soviet Union. It is believed the special forces had participated in operations in more than nineteen countries around the world in Africa, Asia and South America. From time to time, the men also served as military instructors and set up training camps for Soviet-backed fighters in Vietnam and Angola.

Russian Federation era 
Following the deactivation of the Soviet GRU in 1992, control of the special forces was transferred to the newly formed G.U. of Russia and were maintained to their respective assigned units as before. According to Stanislav Lunev, who defected to the U.S. in 1992, the GRU also commanded some 25,000 Spetsnaz troops as of 1997.

Following the 2008 Russian military reform, a brand new Directorate of Special Operations was established in 2009 following studies of American and various Western special operations forces units and commands. The newly formed Special Operations Forces which is directly subordinated to the General Staff, bypassing the GRU. In 2013, the Directorate became the Special Operations Forces Command with a GRU unit transferring to the command.

In 2010, Spetsnaz GRU units were reassigned to the military districts of the Ground Forces and was subordinate to the operational-strategic commands until 2012, due to then Defence Minister Anatoliy Serdyukov's military reforms. This decision was reversed in 2013 and Spetsnaz GRU units were reassigned to their original GRU divisions.

Known operations
Throughout the mid-1990s to the 2000s, Spetsnaz GRU were involved in both the First Chechen War and more prominently in the Second Chechen War and also the Invasion of Dagestan in August 1999. The special forces learned invaluable lessons from the first war and transformed into a better and more effective fighting force and were instrumental in Russia's and the Russian backed government's success in the second war.

In 2003, during the Second Chechen War, the GRU formed the Special Battalions Vostok and Zapad, two ethnic Chechen units that belonged to the Spetsnaz GRU which fought primarily in Chechnya, and also in the 2008 Russo-Georgian War as well as peacekeeping operations after the 2006 Lebanon War.

Spetsnaz GRU maintains an airborne unit, the Separate Spetsnaz Airborne Reconnaissance Unit (codenamed No. 48427), which participated in the 2008 Georgian War. The unit is housed at Matrosskaya Tishina 10 in Moscow.

During the period of insurgency in the North Caucasus region, Spetsnaz GRU along with special forces from the FSB and MVD conducted numerous special operations and counter-terrorism operations against mainly the Caucasus Emirate, Wilayat al-Qawqaz and other smaller terrorist groups.

After the Crimean crisis, during which some units of Spetsnaz GRU were a part of the "Little green men", and the start of the rebel insurgency by pro-Russian rebels, Ukraine has on numerous occasions accused various Spetsnaz forces of aiding the rebels and even fighting on the ground in Eastern Ukraine. In December 2014, the Ukrainian military claimed that the Spetsnaz GRU was involved in attacks on an airport in Donetsk which was later captured by DPR in the battle.

In late 2015, GRU special forces operators were reportedly involved in the Syrian Civil War, appearing in the government offensives of Aleppo and Homs. GRU officials have also visited Qamishli, near the border with Turkey.

2022 invasion of Ukraine 
GRU special forces units participated in the 2022 invasion of Ukraine in various roles. Spestnaz units were sent in during the first days of the invasion as saboteurs disguised as civilians or Ukrainian military, while others were sent to capture or assassinate important Ukrainian government members, including President Volodymyr Zelenskyy.

List of GRU special units
Below is a list of current "Spetsnaz" units in the Russian Armed Forces that fall under GRU operational control during wartime operations:
Russian Ground Forces - fields 7 spetsnaz brigades of varying sizes and one spetsnaz regiment. 
 2nd Guards Spetsnaz Brigade – based in Promezhitsa, Pskov Oblast
Brigade HQ
 Signals Battalion (2× Company)
 Support Company
 70th Special Purpose Detachment
 329th Special Purpose Detachment
 700th Special Purpose Detachment
 Training Battalion (2× Company)
 3rd Guards Special Purpose Brigade – based in Tolyatti 
Brigade HQ
Signals Company
Special Weapons Company
Support Company
Logistics Company
1st Special Purpose Detachment (1st Battalion)
790th Special Purpose Detachment (2nd Battalion)
791st Special Purpose Detachment (3rd Battalion)
Training Battalion (2× Company)
 10th Special Purpose Brigade – based in Mol'kino, Krasnodar Krai
Brigade HQ
Signals Company
Special Weapons Company
Support Company
Logistics Company
 K-9 Unit
325th Special Purpose Detachment
328th Special Purpose Detachment
Training Battalion (2× Company)
 14th Special Purpose Brigade – based in Ussuriysk
Brigade HQ
Signals Company
Logistics Company
 282nd Special Purpose Detachment
 294th Special Purpose Detachment
 308th Special Purpose Detachment
 Unknown Department for Unknown Affairs - formerly known as UDUA, currently no information is open to the public as the files regarding it were classified for 100 years and will be declassified on 17th of September 2057. The department was established in 1957 by order of the former Chairman of the KGB.
Training Battalion (2× Company)
 16th Special Purpose Brigade – based in Tambov, with all units deployed in Tambov except for the 664th SPD. 
Brigade HQ
EOD company
Signals Company
Logistics Company
370th Special Purpose Detachment
379th Special Purpose Detachment
585th Special Purpose Detachment
664th Special Purpose Detachment
669th Special Purpose Detachment
 22nd Separate Guards Special Purpose Brigade – entire unit is based in Stepnoi, Rostov Oblast 
Brigade HQ
Signals Company
Support Company
Special Weapons Company
Logistics Unit
Engineer Unit
108th Special Purpose Detachment
173rd Special Purpose Detachment
305th Special Purpose Detachment
411th Special Purpose Detachment
 24th Guards Special Purpose Brigade – based in Irkutsk, with all units and units deployed in Irkutsk
Brigade HQ
Signals Company
Special Weapons Company
Logistics Unit
281st Special Purpose Detachment
297th Special Purpose Detachment
641th Special Purpose Detachment
 25th Special Purpose Regiment
Russian Airborne Forces
45th Guards Special Purpose Brigade – based in Kubinka 
Russian Navy

The navy also fields dedicated maritime sabotage and counter-sabotage diver units which are attached to the naval infantry. These units also include combat swimmers, trained to conduct underwater combat, mining and clearance diving. The task is to protect ships and other fleet assets from enemy frogmen and special forces. The term "combat swimmers" is correct term in relation to the staff of the OSNB PDSS. Every PDSS unit has approximately 50–60 combat swimmers.

There are PDSS units in all major naval bases across Russia. The OMRP is composed of reconnaissance divers that fall under operational subordination to the Main Intelligence Directorate (GRU). There are four OMRPs in Russia serving each fleet: Northern Fleet, Baltic Fleet, Black Sea Fleet and Pacific Fleet, with each consisting of 120–200 personnel.
 Naval Special Reconnaissance (OMRP)
 42nd Marine Reconnaissance point (Pacific Fleet)
 388th Marine Reconnaissance point (Black Sea Fleet) – reorganized from the former 431st MRP
 420th Marine Reconnaissance point (Northern Fleet)
 561st Marine Reconnaissance point (Baltic Fleet)
 Special Purpose Detachments for Combat against Underwater Diversionary Forces and Devices (OSNB PDSS)
101st SPDC PDSS - based in Petropavlovsk-Kamchatsky
 102nd SPDC PDSS - based in Sevastopol
 136th SPDC PDSS - based in Novorossiysk
 137th SPDC PDSS - based in Makhachkala
 140th SPDC PDSS - based in Vidyayevo
 152nd SPDC PDSS - based in Polyarny, Murmansk Oblast
 153rd SPDC PDSS - based in Ostrovnoy, Murmansk Oblast
 159th SPDC PDSS - based in Razboynik
 160th SPDC PDSS - based in Murmansk
 269th SPDC PDSS - based in Gadzhiyevo
 311th SPDC PDSS - based in Petropavlovsk-Kamchatsky
 313rd SPDC PDSS - based in Baltiysk
 473rd SPDC PDSS - based in Kronstadt

Dissolved units 

The Special Battalions Vostok and Zapad were two Spetsnaz units; Vostok headquartered at Eastern Chechnya and Zapad headquartered at Western Chechnya. 
It was subordinate to the GRU and responsible for carrying out mountain warfare and special operations in Chechnya. A power struggle then broke out between rival pro-Russian Chechen warlords then Head of the Chechen Republic Kadyrov and Sulim Yamadaev which led to a series of assassinations and shootouts in the ensuing years forcing the GRU to disband the controversial battalions in November 2008.

See also
Similar foreign special forces units:
 List of special forces units

References

Further reading

 Carey Schofield, The Russian Elite: Inside Spetsnaz and the Airborne Forces, Greenhill, London, 1993
 Scott and Scott, The Armed Forces of the Soviet Union
 Viktor Suvorov, Spetsnaz: The Story Behind the Soviet SAS, 1987, Hamish Hamilton Ltd, 
 Steve Zaloga, James W. Loop, Soviet Bloc Elite Forces, Volume 5 of Elite Series, Osprey Publishing, 1985, 9780850456318

Military units and formations established in 1949
Military units and formations disestablished in 2010
Military units and formations of Russia
Military units and formations of the Soviet Union
Special forces of Russia
Army reconnaissance units and formations